Acrossus is a genus of scarab beetles in the family Scarabaeidae. There are more than 40 described species in Acrossus, found in Asia, Europe, Africa, and the Americas.

Species
These 43 species belong to the genus Acrossus:

 Acrossus angustiarum (Balthasar, 1967)
 Acrossus atratus (Waterhouse, 1875)
 Acrossus belousovi (Frolov, 2001)
 Acrossus bimaculatus (Laxmann, 1770)
 Acrossus binaevulus (Heyden, 1887)
 Acrossus bolognai (Carpaneto & Piattella, 1989)
 Acrossus byki Minkina, 2018
 Acrossus carpetanus (Graëlls, 1847)
 Acrossus delavayi (Koshantschikov, 1916)
 Acrossus depressus (Kugelann, 1792)
 Acrossus devabhumi (Mittal, 1993)
 Acrossus eberti (Balthasar, 1965)
 Acrossus emodus (Petrovitz, 1976)
 Acrossus formosanus (Nomura & Nakane, 1951)
 Acrossus gagatinus (Ménétriés, 1832)
 Acrossus haliki (Balthasar, 1932)
 Acrossus histrio (Balthasar, 1932)
 Acrossus hrubanti (Balthasar, 1961)
 Acrossus humerospinosus (Petrovitz, 1958)
 Acrossus igai (Nakane, 1956)
 Acrossus japonicus (Nomura & Nakane, 1951)
 Acrossus jedlickai (Balthasar, 1932)
 Acrossus jeloneki Minkina, 2018
 Acrossus jubingensis (Balthasar, 1967)
 Acrossus klickai (Balthasar, 1932)
 Acrossus koreanensis (Kim, 1986)
 Acrossus kwanhsiensis (Balthasar, 1945)
 Acrossus laticollis (Baudi, 1870)
 Acrossus longepilosus (Schmidt, 1911)
 Acrossus luridus (Fabricius, 1775)
 Acrossus milloti Paulian, 1945
 Acrossus opacipennis (Schmidt, 1910)
 Acrossus planicollis (Reitter, 1890)
 Acrossus ritsemai (Schmidt, 1909)
 Acrossus rubripennis (Horn, 1870)
 Acrossus rufipes (Linnaeus, 1758)
 Acrossus semiopacus (Reitter, 1887)
 Acrossus siculus (Harold, 1862)
 Acrossus superatratus (Nomura & Nakane, 1951)
 Acrossus tiabi (Masumoto, 1988)
 Acrossus tingitanus (Reitter, 1892)
 Acrossus unifasciatus (Nomura & Nakane, 1951)
 Acrossus ustulatus (Harold, 1862)

References

External links

 

Scarabaeidae
Scarabaeidae genera
Taxa named by Étienne Mulsant